Sonia Savitri Parag (born 1983) is a Guyanese politician.  She is the current Guyanese minister of public affairs in President Irfaan Ali's Cabinet. Parag was sworn in as a minister on August 5, 2020.

Early life 
Parag was born in Anna Regina around 1983 to Hukumchand and Edith Parag. She has eight siblings.

Like her father Hukumchand and sister Kamini, Parag is an attorney at law.  After completing her LLB at the University of Guyana in 2005, Parag attended Hugh Wooding Law School and received her Legal Education Certificate in August 2007.  She was called to the bar in Guyana in October 2007.

References 

Living people
1983 births
People from Pomeroon-Supenaam
University of Guyana alumni
Government ministers of Guyana
Women government ministers of Guyana
People's Progressive Party (Guyana) politicians
South American political people